Peabody Preserve is a  natural land area located in between the Hudson River and Fremont Pond, in Sleepy Hollow, New York, United States. The Preserve contains hiking trails, multiple habitats, wetlands, a retaining pool and diverse species of flora and fauna. The Reserve was created to protect and restore native ecological communities and wetlands, serve as an outdoor classroom for students and teachers, and provide recreational opportunities to all visitors.

Wildlife
Many wildlife species native to New York, can be found around the Peabody Preserve; such as white tailed deer, beavers, red tail hawk, and great blue herons.
Fish
Frogs
Turtle
Songbirds
Birds of prey
Insects
Skunks
Raccoons

Education resource
The Peabody Preserve serves as an outdoor classroom. The Peabody site provides experiential learning for local schools and colleges in Tarrytown and Sleepy Hollow; including the greater Westchester County.

Class projects
Class projects which local schools use for studying include:
Environmental protection 
Preserving resources
Creating an inventory of flora, fauna, and wildlife 
Measuring and documenting microorganisms
Stream composition
Studying laws and regulations of conservation
Site assessments

Water systems and water quality 

Stream and spring
Upper Wetland
Retention pool
Fremont Pond
Lower Wetland
Hudson River

External links
 Facebook page
 Trail map (Facebook)

Tarrytown, New York
Protected areas of Westchester County, New York
Nature reserves in New York (state)